The president of the autonomous government of the Basque Country, Spain is referred to as Eusko Jaurlaritzako lehendakaria in Basque ("president of the Basque Government"). The correspondent title in Spanish is Presidente del Gobierno Vasco and, since recently, lehendakari or the Spanish form lendakari.

List of lehendakaris

Second Republic and exile (19361979)

Restored autonomy (1978present)

Timeline

See also
Lehendakari
Basque Government
Ajuria Enea

References

Politicians from the Basque Country (autonomous community)
Lists of governors and heads of sub-national entities

Basque Autonomous Community Presidents
Lehendakaris